In enzymology, a N5-(carboxyethyl)ornithine synthase is an enzyme that catalyzes the chemical reaction

N5-(L-1-carboxyethyl)-L-ornithine + NADP+ + H2O  L-ornithine + pyruvate + NADPH + H+

The 3 substrates of this enzyme are N5-(L-1-carboxyethyl)-L-ornithine, NADP+, and H2O, whereas its 4 products are L-ornithine, pyruvate, NADPH, and H+.

Nomenclature 

This enzyme belongs to the family of oxidoreductases, specifically those acting on the CH-NH group of donors with NAD+ or NADP+ as acceptor.  The systematic name of this enzyme class is N5-(L-1-carboxyethyl)-L-ornithine:NADP+ oxidoreductase (L-ornithine-forming). Other names in common use include 5-N-(L-1-carboxyethyl)-L-ornithine:NADP+ oxidoreductase, and (L-ornithine-forming).

References 

 

EC 1.5.1
NADPH-dependent enzymes
Enzymes of unknown structure